Roundtop is a mountain located in the Catskill Mountains of New York east-northeast of Roxbury. Hack Flats is located west-southwest, Negro Hill is located north, and Bearpen Mountain is located southeast of Roundtop.

References

Mountains of Delaware County, New York
Mountains of New York (state)